Jacks Knob Trail is a hiking trail that has been designated as a National Recreation Trail in Georgia, US. The trail is managed by the U.S. Forest Service.

The trail starts at Brasstown Bald and heads in a southernly direction along the boundary between Union and Towns counties. Shortly after reaching Jacks Gap, Jacks Knob Trail enters the Mark Trail Wilderness.

References

External links
 Jacks Knob entry in the National Recreational Trail Database
TopoQuest Map showing intersection of the Jacks Knob and Appalachian Trails
Jacks Knob Trail description with Google map to location

Hiking trails in Georgia (U.S. state)
Protected areas of Towns County, Georgia
Protected areas of Union County, Georgia
National Recreation Trails in Georgia (U.S. state)